702 Naval Air Squadron (702 NAS) was a naval squadron of the Royal Navy's Fleet Air Arm. It was based at RNAS Yeovilton in Somerset and earlier at RNAS Portland in Dorset. As a training Squadron it trained all ground and air crew for the sister front-line maritime Lynx squadron, 815 NAS

It merged with 700(W) NAS to form 825 NAS. 702 NAS disbanded on 1 August 2014.

History

Formation and WWII (1936 - 1945)
702 NAS was founded on 15 July 1936 to operate aircraft from the ships of the 2nd Battle Squadron. Operating Supermarine Walrus and Fairey Seal aircraft from its base at RAF Mount Batten initially, later these were replaced by the Fairey Swordfish float-plane.
Granted Squadron status in 1939, and briefly disbanded in 1940, 702 Naval Air Squadron reformed as a Long Range Catapult squadron with Fairey Seafoxes for duty in Armed Merchant Cruisers for much of the Second World War.

Naval Jet Evaluation Training Unit
In 1949 the squadron reformed at RNAS Culdrose as the Naval Jet Evaluation Training Unit. The squadron was renumbered as 738 Naval Air Squadron in 1952.

Aircrew and Maintainer training squadron (1978 - 2014)
702 was reformed in 1978 and has since operated the Westland Lynx HAS2, HAS3 and HMA8. The squadron is tasked to provide aircrew training and maintenance personnel for the Maritime Lynx, ready for ship's flights. It has a complement of around 160 aircrew and maintainers with approximately a further 20 aircrew and 115 maintainers in training per annum also providing refresher training for an additional 30 aircrew.

In 1981 these roles were split and the parenting duty became the charge of 815 Naval Air Squadron.  The following year both squadrons relocated to RNAS Portland for a period of eighteen years before returning to its current location of RNAS Yeovilton in 1999.

702 NAS disbanded at a ceremony held at the Royal Naval Air Station Yeovilton on 1 August 2014.  Its aircraft transferred to 815 NAS and its personnel transferred to either 815 NAS or 825 NAS.

References

External links

700 series Fleet Air Arm squadrons
Air squadrons of the Royal Navy in World War II
Military units and formations established in 1936